Klugia is a genus of bristle flies in the family Tachinidae.

Species
Klugia marginata (Meigen, 1824)

Distribution
Belarus, Czech Republic, Hungary, Latvia, Lithuania, Poland, Romania, Slovakia, Ukraine, Denmark, Finland, Norway, Sweden, Bulgaria, Italy, Serbia, Spain, Turkey, Austria, France, Germany, Switzerland, Iran, Mongolia, Russia, Transcaucasia.

References

Diptera of Europe
Diptera of Asia
Dexiinae
Tachinidae genera
Taxa named by Jean-Baptiste Robineau-Desvoidy